Ahmed Al-Waeli Al-Laithi Al-Kinani (1928–2003) was a prominent Arab Shia Islamic Scholar, who preached the Islamic thoughts through books and lectures. He was also a poet. His poems represent his personality, spirituality and belief. In addition to his traditional studies in Najaf, he obtained a master's degree from University of Baghdad and a PhD from Cairo University.

Biography

Ahmed Al-Waeli was born in September, 1928 in Najaf, Iraq. He came from a very well cultured family. His father (Sheikh Hassoun Al-Waeli) was also a religious cleric and a poet. However, he did not become as famous as his son Ahmed. From his youth, Ahmed Al-Waeli was smart and ambitious. He studied and memorized the Qur'an when he was seven years old. He graduated with an honor degree in 1962 in Arabic language and Islamic Jurisprudence. Then, he pursued his education in the institute of higher education –one of the institutes of university of Baghdad- and finished his master's degree in the same subject. The title of his thesis is “Custody Rules in Sharia and Law” which was published as a book later. He then left Iraq and went to Egypt to pursue his doctorate education. He received his PhD in economics in 1972 and his dissertation discusses the Islamic view of exploitation of labor.

As Najaf is famous with Shiite Islamic religious schools and Arabic literature, Al-Waeli studied under prominent religious figures. He learned lecturing through a group of Islamic lecturers including Sayyid Baqir Slaimoun. He gained great admiration from his teachers through his intelligence, articulation, and presentation style. Ayatollah Imam Khomeini called him “the Islamic Library” as he was spreading his rich knowledge as well as lecturing the philosophy of Islamic jurisprudences in different places. Likewise, Grand Ayatollah Abul-Qassim Khoei called him "the Tongue of Shia" as his voice represents Shia ideology. One of his common messages in his lectures is that the differences between Shia and Sunnah jurisprudences should not create tension between the two sects since both sects ultimately have the same goal (which is getting closer to Allah). He repeatedly conveys that each sect has his own Ijtihad (interpretation of Hadith) but that should not create tension. He always condemned those whom called Shia non-Muslims.

Al-Waeli died in Baghdad on July 14, 2003 in his homeland after 24 years in exile. Thousands of people gathered in his funeral in the city of Najaf to express their sorrow and sympathy for his departure.

Presentation style

Al-Waeli has become famous with his presentation and lecturing style. In fact, his lecturing style (or school) is now known as “Al-Waeli’s School of Lecturing.” The main characteristics of this school are:

1. Topic Focus: this is the most important characteristic in this school. Unlike other Islamic lecturers, Al-Waeli concentrates only on one subject in each lecture and does not branch out to different subjects. The purpose of this is to avoid confusing and losing the audience’s attention, and to provide enough details to cover the subject. This is not an easy task. In fact, it requires a big effort from the lecturer to study the subject thoroughly before lecturing to make sure that all aspects of the topic are covered. Besides, he starts his presentation with a short statement that describes the focus of his lecture. This statement is usually a verse from the Qur'an.

2. Courage and Sincerity: His confidence and knowledge gave him the courage to speak the truth and defend his school of thought.

3. Audience Evaluation: Al-Waeli has the ability to evaluate his audience before lecturing. This ability simplified the choice and depth of the topic he would present. Also, through this ability, he gained the audience’s attention and interest.

4. Voice Pitch: Al-Waeli’s vocal quality helped him articulate his speech.

5. High Morals: Al-Waeli is known for his high morals and virtues which developed his charisma and power of persuasion.

Books

Al-Waeli wrote several books including:
 The Essence of Shiism
 Custody Rules in Sharia and Law
 Islamic View of Exploitation of Labor
 The Defense of Truth
 My Experience with Husayni Pulpit
 Toward a Scientific Interpretation of Qur'an

External links
http://www.ahmedalwaeli.com/ 
 http://www.Al-Waeli.com/ 
 http://www.alwaeli.org/  
 http://www.kerbalaya.net/hashemya5/a1a/indexa1a.htm  
 http://www.shiaweb.org/v2/sounds/viewcat_72.html 

1928 births
2003 deaths
Iraqi Shia clerics
People from Najaf
Iraqi Shia Muslims
Twelvers